The 1992 Swiss Indoors was a men's tennis tournament played on indoor hard courts at the St. Jakobshalle in Basel, Switzerland that was part of the World Series of the 1992 ATP Tour. It was the 23rd edition of the tournament and was held from 28 September until 4 October 1992. Second-seeded Boris Becker won the singles title.

Finals

Singles

 Boris Becker defeated  Petr Korda 3–6, 6–3, 6–2, 6–4
 It was Becker's 3rd singles title of the year and the 34th of his career.

Doubles

 Tom Nijssen /  Cyril Suk defeated  Karel Nováček /  David Rikl 6–3, 6–4

References

External links
 ITF tournament edition profile

Swiss Indoors
Swiss Indoors
1992 in Swiss tennis